Aoutneil "Neil" Jacques Magny (born August 3, 1987) is an American professional mixed martial artist. He currently competes in the Welterweight division in the Ultimate Fighting Championship (UFC). A professional MMA competitor since 2010, Magny made a name for himself as a competitor on The Ultimate Fighter: Team Carwin vs. Team Nelson. As of February 14, 2023, he is #12 in the UFC welterweight rankings.

Background
Born and grew up in New York, Magny is of Haitian, and Dominican descent. Magny moved to Illinois at the age of 12, where graduated from Thornwood High School in the Chicago Southland and then went to Southern Illinois University Edwardsville, where he earned a B.A. in Criminal Justice. He wrestled and played football in both high school and college. He is also an army veteran, having been deployed in Kuwait. He left the service in 2013.

Mixed martial arts career
Magny began competing in MMA professionally in 2010, making his debut August 7, 2010 against Nolan Norwood for the C3 Fights promotion. Magny won the fight via submission (kimura) midway into the second round. Just a few months later Magny again fought for the C3 Fights promotion, fighting against Nate Pratt, winning the fight via unanimous decision. Three weeks after his second win, Magny traveled to Indiana to fight for Cut Throat MMA on their November 6 card. Magny defeated Lawrence Dunning via TKO.

Magny won two more fights, bringing his overall record to 6–0, before being invited to compete in Combat USA's Wisconsin vs. Illinois championship series. Magny won his first round fight against fellow Illinois native, Quartus Stitt, via submission (triangle choke). The win moved Magny into the final round of the welterweight division tournament against a Wisconsin fighter. The final round took place on July 21, 2011 where Magny fought against Andrew Trace. Magny lost the fight via submission, marking the first time Magny had lost in his career.

Magny fought one more time before trying out for the popular reality TV series, The Ultimate Fighter.

The Ultimate Fighter
Magny was subsequently selected as a cast member of The Ultimate Fighter: Team Carwin vs. Team Nelson. He won the elimination fight in order to get into the Ultimate Fighter house by defeating Frank Camacho via decision. Magny was selected fourth (seventh overall) by Shane Carwin to be a part of his team.

In the first fight of the season, Magny was selected to fight against Brazilian Jiu-Jitsu specialist, Cameron Diffley. Magny dominated the fight throughout two rounds and won via unanimous decision.

Magny was then matched up against Team Carwin teammate and IFL and Strikeforce veteran, Bristol Marunde for the quarterfinal round. After two rounds Magny was awarded the unanimous decision victory.

Magny came up short in the semifinals after getting knocked out by Mike Ricci in the first round.

Ultimate Fighting Championship
Magny made his UFC debut against fellow semifinalist Jon Manley on February 23, 2013 at UFC 157. He won the bout via unanimous decision.

Magny faced Sérgio Moraes on August 3, 2013 at UFC 163. He lost the fight via triangle choke in the first round.

Magny faced Seth Baczynski on November 6, 2013 at UFC Fight Night 31. He lost the back-and-forth fight via unanimous decision.

Magny faced UFC newcomer Gasan Umalatov on February 1, 2014 at UFC 169. He effectively utilized his reach advantage in the striking department to win a unanimous decision.

Magny was expected to face William Macário at UFC Fight Night 40. However, Macário was removed from the bout for undisclosed reasons and replaced by returning veteran Tim Means. He won the fight by unanimous decision.

Magny was expected to face Cláudio Silva on June 28, 2014 at UFC Fight Night 43. However, da Silva was forced from the bout due to injury and was replaced by promotional newcomer Rodrigo Goiana de Lima. After spending much of the first round defending against de Lima's strikes and submission attempts on the ground, Magny won the fight via KO in the second round after staggering de Lima with punches throughout the round.

Magny defeated  Alex Garcia via unanimous decision on August 23, 2014 at UFC Fight Night 49.

Magny next fought William Macário at UFC 179. He defeated Macário by TKO in the third round, his fifth UFC win of 2014.

Magny was briefly linked to a bout with Josh Koscheck at UFC 184 on February 28, 2015.  However, the pairing was scrapped and Koscheck faced Jake Ellenberger at the event.

Magny faced Kiichi Kunimoto on February 14, 2015 at UFC Fight Night 60.  Magny defeated Kunimoto via submission in the third round, earning him his first Performance of the Night honors.

Magny faced Lim Hyun-gyu on May 16, 2015 at UFC Fight Night 66.  Magny won the fight via TKO in the second round, which also produced a Performance of the Night bonus.

Magny faced Demian Maia on August 1, 2015 at UFC 190. He lost the fight by submission in the second round.

Just twenty-two days after his loss to Maia, Magny stepped in as a short notice replacement for Rick Story to face Erick Silva on August 23, 2015 at UFC Fight Night 74. He won the fight via split decision.

Magny was expected to face Stephen Thompson on January 2, 2016 at UFC 195. However, Magny replaced Matt Brown to face Kelvin Gastelum on November 21, 2015 at The Ultimate Fighter Latin America 2 Finale. Magny won the fight by split decision Their performance earned both participants Fight of the Night honors.

Magny faced Héctor Lombard on March 20, 2016 at UFC Fight Night 85. After nearly being finished with strikes in the first round, Magny defeated Lombard via TKO in the third round. He also was awarded a Performance of the Night bonus. After this fight with Hector Lombard, Magny signed a four fight extension to his UFC contract.

Magny was expected to face Dong Hyun Kim on August 20, 2016 at UFC 202. However, Kim was removed from the fight on July 12 and was replaced by Lorenz Larkin. He lost the fight via TKO in the first round.

Magny faced Johny Hendricks on December 30, 2016 at UFC 207. At the weigh-ins, Hendricks missed weight for their bout, weighing in at 173.5 lbs. As a result, Magny received 20% of Hendricks' purse and the bout was made a catchweight fight. Magny won the fight via unanimous decision.

Magny faced Rafael dos Anjos on September 9, 2017 at UFC 215. He lost the fight via arm-triangle choke submission in the first round.

Magny faced Carlos Condit on December 30, 2017 at UFC 219. He won the fight by unanimous decision.

Magny was expected to face Gunnar Nelson on May 27, 2018 at UFC Fight Night 130. However, on April 28, 2018, it was reported Nelson was pulled from the event due to knee injury. On May 15, promotional newcomer Craig White was announced as Magny's new opponent. Magny won the fight via technical knock out in round one.

Magny was expected to face Alex Oliveira on September 22, 2018 at UFC Fight Night 137.  However, on August 22, 2018, it was reported that Magny faced Santiago Ponzinibbio on November 10, 2018 at UFC Fight Night 140.  He lost the fight via knockout.

Magny was expected to face Elizeu Zaleski dos Santos on May 18, 2019 at UFC Fight Night 152. However, on March 28, 2019 dos Santos announced that he had not been contacted by the UFC about the match. Magny was the replacement and  expected to face Vicente Luque instead. However, it was reported on May 13, 2019 that Magny pulled out of the bout due to testing positive for Di-Hydroxy-LGD-4033.

Magny faced Li Jingliang on March 7, 2020 at UFC 248. He won the fight by unanimous decision.

Magny faced Anthony Rocco Martin on June 6, 2020 at UFC 250. He won the bout via unanimous decision.

Magny was expected to face Geoff Neal on August 29, 2020 at UFC Fight Night 175. However, Neal withdrew from the event due to health issues and he was replaced by Robbie Lawler. He won the fight via unanimous decision. With this win, Magny earned the second most wins in the welterweight division behind Georges St-Pierre.

Magny faced Michael Chiesa on January 20, 2021 at UFC on ESPN 20. Magny lost the fight via unanimous decision after being controlled on the ground for most of the 5 rounds.

Magny faced Geoff Neal at UFC on ESPN 24 on May 8, 2021. He won the fight via unanimous decision.

Magny faced Max Griffin on March 26, 2022 at UFC on ESPN 33. He won the fight via split decision. With this win, Magny tied Georges St-Pierre for the most wins in the UFC welterweight division with nineteen.

Magny faced Shavkat Rakhmonov on June 25, 2022 at UFC on ESPN 38. He lost the fight via a guillotine choke submission in the second round.

Magny was scheduled to face Daniel Rodriguez on October 15, 2022 at UFC Fight Night 212. However, Rodriguez withdrew from the bout due to elbow infection. The bout was rescheduled for UFC Fight Night: Rodriguez vs. Lemos on November 5. He won the fight via D'Arce choke submission in the third round. This win earned him the Performance of the Night award.

Magny faced Gilbert Burns on January 21, 2023, at UFC 283. He lost the fight via an arm-triangle choke submission in the first round.

Personal life
Magny and his wife have a son, Liam (born 2020).

Championships and accomplishments
Ultimate Fighting Championship
Tied (Roger Huerta, Kevin Holland) for most wins in a calendar year (5 wins in 2014)
Most decision wins in UFC history (13)
Most decision wins in UFC Welterweight history (13)
Most wins in UFC Welterweight history (20)
Most significant strikes landed in UFC Welterweight history (1296)
Tied (Georges St-Pierre, Kamaru Usman, Frankie Edgar) for second most unanimous decision wins in UFC history (10)
Most decision bouts in UFC Welterweight history (15)
Longest fight time in UFC Welterweight history (5:58:19)
Tied (Matt Brown) for most bouts in UFC Welterweight division history (29)
Fight of the Night (One Time) 
Performance of the Night (Four times)

Mixed martial arts record

|-
|Loss
|align=center|27–10
|Gilbert Burns
|Submission (arm-triangle choke)
|UFC 283
|
|align=center|1
|align=center|4:15
|Rio de Janeiro, Brazil
|
|-
|Win
|align=center|27–9
|Daniel Rodriguez
|Submission (D'Arce choke)
|UFC Fight Night: Rodriguez vs. Lemos
|
|align=center|3
|align=center|3:32
|Las Vegas, Nevada, United States
|
|-
|Loss
|align=center|26–9
|Shavkat Rakhmonov
|Submission (guillotine choke)
|UFC on ESPN: Tsarukyan vs. Gamrot
|
|align=center|2
|align=center|4:58
|Las Vegas, Nevada, United States
|
|-
|Win
|align=center|26–8
|Max Griffin
|Decision (split)
|UFC on ESPN: Blaydes vs. Daukaus
|
|align=center|3
|align=center|5:00
|Columbus, Ohio, United States
|
|-
|Win
|align=center|25–8
|Geoff Neal
|Decision (unanimous)
|UFC on ESPN: Rodriguez vs. Waterson
|
|align=center|3
|align=center|5:00
|Las Vegas, Nevada, United States
|
|-
|Loss
|align=center|24–8
|Michael Chiesa
|Decision (unanimous)
|UFC on ESPN: Chiesa vs. Magny 
|
|align=center|5
|align=center|5:00
|Abu Dhabi, United Arab Emirates
| 
|-
|Win
|align=center|24–7
|Robbie Lawler
|Decision (unanimous)
|UFC Fight Night: Smith vs. Rakić
|
|align=center|3
|align=center|5:00
|Las Vegas, Nevada, United States
|
|-
|Win
|align=center|23–7
|Anthony Rocco Martin
|Decision (unanimous)
|UFC 250
|
|align=center|3
|align=center|5:00
|Las Vegas, Nevada, United States
|
|- 
|Win
|align=center|22–7
|Li Jingliang
|Decision (unanimous)
|UFC 248
|
|align=center|3
|align=center|5:00
|Las Vegas, Nevada, United States
|
|-
|Loss
|align=center|21–7
|Santiago Ponzinibbio
|KO (punch)
|UFC Fight Night: Magny vs. Ponzinibbio 
|
|align=center|4
|align=center|2:36
|Buenos Aires, Argentina
| 
|- 
|Win
|align=center|21–6
|Craig White
|KO (knee and punches)
|UFC Fight Night: Thompson vs. Till
|
|align=center|1
|align=center|4:32
|Liverpool, England
|
|-
|Win
|align=center|20–6
|Carlos Condit
|Decision (unanimous)
|UFC 219
|
|align=center|3
|align=center|5:00
|Las Vegas, Nevada, United States
|
|-
|Loss
|align=center|19–6
|Rafael dos Anjos
|Submission (arm-triangle choke)
|UFC 215 
|
|align=center|1
|align=center|3:43
|Edmonton, Alberta, Canada
|
|-
|Win
|align=center|19–5
|Johny Hendricks
|Decision (unanimous)
|UFC 207
|
|align=center|3
|align=center|5:00
|Las Vegas, Nevada, United States
|
|-
|Loss
|align=center|18–5
|Lorenz Larkin
|TKO (elbows)
|UFC 202 
|
|align=center|1
|align=center|4:08
|Las Vegas, Nevada, United States
|  
|-
|Win
|align=center|18–4
|Héctor Lombard
|TKO (punches)
|UFC Fight Night: Hunt vs. Mir
|
|align=center|3
|align=center|0:46
|Brisbane, Australia
| 
|-
|Win
|align=center|17–4
|Kelvin Gastelum 
|Decision (split)
|The Ultimate Fighter Latin America 2 Finale: Magny vs. Gastelum
|
|align=center|5
|align=center|5:00
|Monterrey, Mexico
|
|-
|Win
|align=center|16–4
|Erick Silva
|Decision (split)
|UFC Fight Night: Holloway vs. Oliveira
|
|align=center|3
|align=center|5:00
|Saskatoon, Saskatchewan, Canada
|
|-
| Loss
|align=center|15–4
|Demian Maia
|Submission (rear-naked choke)
|UFC 190
|
|align=center|2
|align=center|2:52
|Rio de Janeiro, Brazil
|
|-
|Win
|align=center|15–3
|Lim Hyun-gyu
|TKO (punches)
|UFC Fight Night: Edgar vs. Faber
|
|align=center|2
|align=center|1:24
|Pasay, Philippines
|
|-
|Win
|align=center|14–3
|Kiichi Kunimoto
|Submission (rear-naked choke)
|UFC Fight Night: Henderson vs. Thatch
|
|align=center|3
|align=center|1:22
|Broomfield, Colorado, United States
|
|-
|Win
|align=center|13–3
|William Macário
|TKO (punches)
|UFC 179
|
|align=center|3
|align=center|2:40
|Rio de Janeiro, Brazil
|
|-
|Win
|align=center|12–3
|Alex Garcia
|Decision (unanimous)
|UFC Fight Night: Henderson vs. dos Anjos
|
|align=center|3
|align=center|5:00
|Tulsa, Oklahoma, United States
|
|-
|Win
|align=center|11–3
|Rodrigo de Lima
|KO (punches)
|UFC Fight Night: Te Huna vs. Marquardt
|
|align=center|2
|align=center|2:32
|Auckland, New Zealand
|
|-
|Win
|align=center|10–3
|Tim Means
|Decision (unanimous)
|UFC Fight Night: Brown vs. Silva
|
|align=center|3
|align=center|5:00
|Cincinnati, Ohio, United States
|
|-
|Win
|align=center|9–3
|Gasan Umalatov
|Decision (unanimous)
|UFC 169
|
|align=center|3
|align=center|5:00
|Newark, New Jersey, United States
|
|-
|Loss
|align=center|8–3
|Seth Baczynski
|Decision (unanimous)
|UFC: Fight for the Troops 3
|
|align=center|3
|align=center|5:00
|Fort Campbell, Kentucky, United States
|
|-
|Loss
|align=center|8–2
|Sérgio Moraes
|Submission (triangle choke)
|UFC 163
|
|align=center|1
|align=center|3:13
|Rio de Janeiro, Brazil
|
|-
|Win
|align=center|8–1
|Jon Manley
|Decision (unanimous)
|UFC 157
|
|align=center|3
|align=center|5:00
|Anaheim, California, United States
|
|-
|Win
|align=center|7–1
|Daniel Sandmann
|Decision (unanimous)
|Hoosier Fight Club 10
|
|align=center|3
|align=center|5:00
|Valparaiso, Indiana, United States
|
|-
|Loss
|align=center|6–1
|Andrew Trace
|Submission (guillotine choke)
|Combat USA 30
|
|align=center|1
|align=center|3:10
|Oshkosh, Wisconsin, United States
|
|-
|Win
|align=center|6–0
|Quartus Stitt
|Submission (triangle choke)
|Combat USA 27
|
|align=center|2
|align=center|0:38
|Racine, Wisconsin, United States
|
|-
|Win
|align=center|5–0
|Kevin Nowaczyk
|Decision (unanimous)
|Hoosier Fight Club 7
|
|align=center|3
|align=center|5:00
|Valparaiso, Indiana, United States
|
|-
|Win
|align=center|4–0
|Darion Terry
|TKO (punches)
|Rumble Time Promotions 7
|
|align=center|3
|align=center|2:13
|St. Charles, Missouri, United States
|
|-
|Win
|align=center|3–0
|Lawrence Dunning
|TKO (punches)
|Cut Throat MMA 1
|
|align=center|2
|align=center|3:09
|Hammond, Indiana, United States
|
|-
|Win
|align=center|2–0
|Nate Pratt
|Decision (unanimous)
|C3 Fights 6
|
|align=center|3
|align=center|5:00
|Newkirk, Oklahoma, United States
|
|-
|Win
|align=center|1–0
|Nolan Norwood
|Submission (kimura)
|C3 Fights 5
|
|align=center|2
|align=center|2:44
|Newkirk, Oklahoma, United States
|
|}

Mixed martial arts exhibition record

|-
|Loss
|align=center|3–1
| Mike Ricci
| KO (elbows)
| The Ultimate Fighter: Team Carwin vs. Team Nelson
| (airdate)
|align=center|1
|align=center|4:12
|Las Vegas, Nevada, United States
|
|-
|Win
|align=center|3–0
| Bristol Marunde
| Decision (unanimous)
| The Ultimate Fighter: Team Carwin vs. Team Nelson
|
|align=center|2
|align=center|5:00
|Las Vegas, Nevada, United States
|
|-
|Win
|align=center|2–0
| Cameron Diffley
| Decision (unanimous) 
| The Ultimate Fighter: Team Carwin vs. Team Nelson
|
|align=center|2
|align=center|5:00
|Las Vegas, Nevada, United States
|
|-
|Win
|align=center|1–0
|  Frank Camacho
| Decision (unanimous)
| The Ultimate Fighter: Team Carwin vs. Team Nelson
| (airdate)
|align=center|3
|align=center|5:00
|Las Vegas, Nevada, United States
|
|-

See also
 List of current UFC fighters
 List of male mixed martial artists

References

External links
 
 

1987 births
African-American mixed martial artists
American male mixed martial artists
Living people
Welterweight mixed martial artists
Mixed martial artists utilizing Brazilian jiu-jitsu
Mixed martial artists from New York (state)
American practitioners of Brazilian jiu-jitsu
American sportspeople of Haitian descent
American people of Dominican Republic descent
Ultimate Fighting Championship male fighters
21st-century African-American sportspeople
20th-century African-American people